Iluta Gaile (born 10 December 1968) is a Latvian businesswoman, politician and former luger, who competed at four Winter Olympic Games. She is a former deputy for Riga City Council.

Personal life
Gaile was born in Cēsis, Latvia SSR (now Latvia), and grew up in Stalbe. As of 2017, Gaile lived in Sigulda. As a teenager, Gaile trained on the Cēsis track.

Sporting career
Gaile competed in the luge event at four Winter Olympic Games. She finished 10th in 1992, 17th in 1994, 14th in 1998, and 10th in 2002.

In 1988 and 1989, she came third in the USSR national championships, and in 1990, she came second in the event. In 1988, she won the Latvia SSR national championships, and in 1994, 1998, and 2000, she won the Latvian national championships. She was part of the Latvian team that won the 1991 Luge World Cup event in Germany. Her best individual result at the FIL World Luge Championships was 8th in 2001.

Political career
After retiring from luge, Gaile undertook a master's degree in entrepreneurship. She later set up a recruitment company, IG Konsultācijas. In 2005, she stood for the People's Party as a deputy for Riga City Council. She was not initially selected, but was given the seat after  died in 2006.

References

External links
 
 
 
 

1968 births
Living people
People from Cēsis
People's Party (Latvia) politicians
Latvian female lugers
Olympic lugers of Latvia
Lugers at the 1992 Winter Olympics
Lugers at the 1994 Winter Olympics
Lugers at the 1998 Winter Olympics
Lugers at the 2002 Winter Olympics